Grand Ayatollah Muhammad Is'haq al-Fayadh (the word al-Fayadh also spelt al-Fayad), is one of the most senior Shi'a marja living in Iraq after Ali al-Sistani.

Biography
Born in Jaghori  Soba village in Ghazni province, Afghanistan to Hazara ethnic group, he holds Afghan citizenship. His family was farmers and he started learning the Qur'an from the village cleric when he was five. When he was 10 his family moved to Najaf, where he studied various Islamic studies including Arabic language, rhetoric, logic, Islamic philosophy, the Hadith and Islamic jurisprudence, eventually studying under Grand Ayatollah Abu al-Qasim al-Khoei. When al-Khoei died in 1992 he supported Ali al-Sistani as the chair of the marjaiya in Najaf.

Under Saddam Hussein he adopted a quietist approach, avoiding politics and confrontation with the government.

Following the invasion of Iraq by the United States and allies in 2003, al-Fayyad engaged more than any other marja with the occupying American and British military and diplomats, informing them of the views of the senior clerics. He adopted similar positions to al-Sistani and the other marjaiya: supporting a united Shiite slate for the first Iraqi elections; calling for Islam to be the sole source of Iraqi law; supporting a yes vote in the referendum on the constitution;  rejecting a secular Iraq; and opposing the adoption of doctrine of the Guardianship of the Islamic Jurists as adopted by the Islamic Republic of Iran. However, of all the marja'iyya Fayyad is reported to be the biggest opponent of the concept of the Guardianship of the Islamic Jurists. However, this report is contradicted by the official website of the Shi'a Marja, wherein he remarks, "The correct opinion regarding the issue of "Vilayat-e-Faqih" (Guardianship of the Islamic Jurist) is that this issue requires no external proof, because the continuation of Islamic law, and its application, is dependent upon the continuation of the system of Vilayat". He continues, "The vilayat of the Prophet and the immaculate Imams, and in the time of the major occultation of the 12th Imam, the Islamic Jurist is bestowed with this vilayat ... It is unimaginable that Islamic Law could continue to exist without the continuation of this vilayat". Furthermore, he is one of the Ulama signatories of the Amman Message, which gives a broad foundation for defining Muslim orthodoxy.

He has written some books on Islamic jurisprudence, Islamic politics, and Islamic banking. A very innovative position of him is written in his book on women's role in society with the title 'Jāyegāh Zan dar Nizām Siyāsīyeh Islām' (English title: 'The position of women in the Islamic political system'). In 2007, press reports indicated that he was supervising the religious studies of the radical cleric Muqtada al-Sadr.

Positions

Socio-political role of women in Islamic societies 
Grand Ayatollah al-Fayadh is one of the few Islamic Shia Ayatollahs who are in favor of women in positions of political leadership.
In June 2018 an article was written on a Persian website, which was later translated into English. There the Islamic position of Ayatollah al-Fayadh concerning the position of women in Islamic society was discussed, citing his book 'Jāyegāh Zan dar Nizām Siyāsīyeh Islām' (English title: 'The position of women in the Islamic political system') on that subject.
"In response to some jurisprudential questions concerning the role of women in society, he declared it permissible for women to take any of the three following positions: political leader, judge and religious jurisconsult."

The article continues to explain al-Fayadh' opinion concerning women and the different positions they can take in society:
"It is irrespective of whether this is a social position like politics or an individual one like being a driver, a pilot, etc. With this reasoning he believes that in all spheres of life, be it social, individual, ideological, freedom of expression, business, financial trading, land cultivation, etc. women and men are completely equal."

See Also
Ali al-Sistani
Abu al-Qasim al-Khoei
Muhammad Hossein Naini 
Muhammad Kazim Khurasani
Mirza Husayn Tehrani
Abdallah Mazandarani
Mirza Ali Aqa Tabrizi
Mirza Sayyed Mohammad Tabatabai
Seyyed Abdollah Behbahani
Fazlullah Nouri

References

External links
Official Arabic Website
Official Farsi Website
Download site of his online books in English, Arabic and Farsi
Slate profile

Afghan emigrants to Iraq
Afghan Shia Muslims
Afghan grand ayatollahs
Iraqi people of Hazara descent
Hazara people
Hazara religious leaders
1930 births
Living people
People from Najaf
Iraqi grand ayatollahs
20th-century Islamic religious leaders
21st-century Islamic religious leaders
Iraqi people of Afghan descent